Suggs Creek is an unincorporated community in Wilson County, Tennessee, United States. It is located around the intersection of Stewarts Ferry Pike and Corinth Road.  The community has a general store (Suggs Creek General Store) and two churches (Suggs Creek Presby & Corinth Road Church of Christ). Suggs Creek is also home to Lucky Lantern Farm, which has been featured on RFD TV. The Community also has a local cemetery that predates the Civil War.  The community has roughly 100 rural residences and many farms. It is bordered by Rural Hill, Tennessee to the west, Gladeville to the east and rural Mt. Juliet to the north.

Suggs Creek is found in the southern portion of Wilson County, TN.

Notes

Unincorporated communities in Wilson County, Tennessee
Unincorporated communities in Tennessee